Ivan Burduniuc (born 5 January 1981) is a Moldavian professional football manager and former footballer. Since July 2011 he is the head coach of Moldavian football club FC Saxan.

References

External links
 Ivan Burduniuc at soccerway (as manager)

1981 births
Living people
Moldovan football managers
Moldovan Super Liga managers